Karin Mailis Laserow (born 19 February 1950) is a Swedish antiques dealer and TV personality. She is an expert on the television show Bytt är bytt which is broadcast on TV4. She is a member of the Swedish art and antiques dealers association. She runs the antiques company Laserow Antik in Sweden and New York City. She is married to physiotherapist Kaj Laserow and lives in Brandstad, Sweden.

Laserow received attention when, in the first episode of Bytt är bytt, she almost broke a cello worth 500.000 (SEK).
Karin Laserow is a dealer in high end Swedish antiques as well as interior designers specializing in residential design with offices in both Sweden and New York. She says she was never satisfied with minimalism style. Laserow's design services range from interior furnishings to complete renovations dealing with interior architecture, space planning, and site coordination.

Karin Laserow has been working with antique more than 30 years, and her interest in the theme grows more and more, although at the beginning she chose another profession. Karin worked as a nurse, but then changed her mind and decided to deal with antiques. Karin says: 
Karin issued a book "Swedish Antiques", which was published by Skyhorse Publishing in 2013.

Books
 Karin Mailis Laserow (2013). Swedish Antiques. Skyhorse Publishing

References

Living people
1950 births